This list contains the mobile country codes (MCC) and mobile network codes (MNC) for networks with country codes between 200 and 299, inclusive. This range covers Europe, as well as: the Asian parts of the Russian Federation and Turkey; Georgia; Armenia; Greenland; the Azores and Madeira as parts of Portugal; and the Canary Islands as part of Spain.

National operators

A

Abkhazia – GE-AB

Albania – AL

Andorra – AD

Armenia – AM

Austria – AT

B

Belarus – BY

Belgium – BE

Bosnia and Herzegovina – BA

Bulgaria – BG

C

Croatia – HR

Cyprus – CY

Czech Republic – CZ

D

Denmark (Kingdom of Denmark) – DK

E

Estonia – EE

F

Faroe Islands (Kingdom of Denmark) – FO

Finland – FI

France – FR

G

Georgia – GE

Germany – DE

Gibraltar (United Kingdom) – GI

Greece – GR

Greenland (Kingdom of Denmark) – GL

Guernsey (United Kingdom) – GG

H

Hungary – HU

I

Iceland – IS

Ireland – IE

Isle of Man (United Kingdom) – IM

Italy – IT 
The Vatican is served by Italian networks Iliad Italia, TIM, Vodafone Italy and Wind Tre.

J

Jersey (United Kingdom) – JE

K

Kosovo – XK

L

Latvia – LV

Liechtenstein – LI

Lithuania – LT

Luxembourg – LU

M

Malta – MT

Moldova – MD

Monaco – MC

Montenegro – ME

N

Netherlands (Kingdom of the Netherlands) – NL

North Macedonia – MK

Norway – NO

P

Poland – PL

Portugal – PT

R

Romania – RO

Russian Federation – RU

S

San Marino – SM 
The Republic of San Marino is partially served by Italian networks Iliad Italia, TIM, Vodafone Italy and Wind Tre.

Serbia – RS

Slovakia – SK

Slovenia – SI

Spain – ES

Sweden – SE

Switzerland – CH

T

Turkey – TR

U

Ukraine – UA

United Kingdom – GB

See also
 List of mobile network operators of Europe
 List of LTE networks in Europe

References

Telecommunications lists
Europe-related lists